Mike Bauer and Anand Amritraj were the defending champions, but competed this year with different partners. Bauer teamed up with Butch Walts and lost in the first round to Fritz Buehning and Ferdi Taygan, while Amritraj teamed up with Michael Fancutt and were eliminated in the semifinals, also to Buehning and Taygan.

Sandy Mayer and Andreas Maurer won the title by defeating Buehning and Taygan 7–6, 6–4 in the final.

Seeds

Draw

Draw

References

External links
 Official results archive (ATP)
 Official results archive (ITF)

Stuttgart Doubles
Doubles 1984